Second Coming is the second and final studio album by English rock band the Stone Roses, released through Geffen Records on 5 December 1994 in the UK. It was recorded at Forge Studios in Oswestry, Shropshire and Rockfield Studios near Monmouth in Wales between 1992 and 1994. It went platinum in the UK, sold over 1 million copies worldwide and was dedicated to Philip Hall, the band's publicist, who died of cancer in 1993.

Background
The second album by the Manchester four-piece, it suffered greatly at the time from the sheer weight of expectation generated by both the 5½ year gap between it and the band's eponymous debut, and the band's withdrawal from the live arena for 4½ of those years. There had been speculation in the British press that the high expectations from their debut record had left the band "paralyzed with self-doubt" according to LA Times pop music critic Robert Hilburn. In addition, the Stone Roses made their return to a changed musical environment, having to compete with a new generation of Britpop bands. The album reached number 4 in the UK Album Chart.

Three singles ("Love Spreads", "Ten Storey Love Song", and "Begging You") from the album were released in the UK.

Artwork
The album cover, created by Squire, features a dark, fabric-like collage of photographs, artwork, text and symbols. Most notable is a stone cherub, taken from a photograph of those found on the Newport Town Bridge, smoking a cigarette. The original photograph was later used for the "Love Spreads" single. The liner notes feature black and white photographs of the band members as children.

Critical reception

Second Coming was released to generally mixed reviews in the UK and US. Rolling Stone awarded the record two out of five stars, calling its songs "tuneless retropsychedelic grooves bloated to six-plus minutes in length." The Los Angeles Times were more positive, however, praising John Squire's "inspired guitar work" and concluding that "while the album's impact is undercut by some tunes that seem little more than fragments, the standouts offer a soulful earnestness as they speak of the search for salvation and comfort amid the tension and uncertainty of contemporary life."

Select ranked the album at number twelve in its end-of-year list of the 50 best albums of 1995.

Track listing

Personnel
The Stone Roses
 Ian Brown – lead vocals, harmonica, recording of running water on "Breaking into Heaven"
 John Squire – electric and acoustic guitars, vocals on "Tightrope", backing vocals on "How Do You Sleep", recording of jets on "Begging You", collage
 Mani – bass guitar
 Reni – drums, backing vocals, vocals on "Tightrope", recording of running water on "Breaking into Heaven"

Technical personnel
 Simon Dawson – keyboards, Jew's harp on "Straight to the Man", castanets, Wurlitzer electric piano on "Straight to the Man" and "Tears", acoustic piano on "How Do You Sleep" and "Love Spreads"; production, engineering on tracks 1, 2, 5, 6, 9, 12
 Paul Schroeder – production on tracks 1, 2, 3, 6, 7, 9, 10, 11, engineering on tracks 1, 2, 6, 9
 John Leckie – partly responsible for recording on tracks 3, 7, 11, recording on "Breaking into Heaven" intro
 Mark Tolle – initial recording on tracks 4, 8, 10
 Al "Bongo" Shaw – initial recording on tracks 4, 8, 10
 Nick Brine – assistant engineering; tambourine on "Love Spreads"

Charts

References

External links

Second Coming at YouTube (streamed copy where licensed)

The Stone Roses albums
1994 albums
Britpop albums
Geffen Records albums
Albums recorded at Rockfield Studios